Urshanabi was the ferryman of the Hubur, river of the dead in Mesopotamian mythology. His equivalent in Greek Mythology was Charon.

He is first mentioned in the myth of Enlil and Ninlil, where he is called SI.LU.IGI and described as a man. In the Epic of Gilgamesh, Urshanabi is a companion of Gilgamesh after Enkidu dies. They meet when Urshanabi is involved in the curious occupation of collecting an unintelligible type of "urnu-snakes" in the forest. Urshanabi's ferry is at first powered by unintelligible "stone things", that are destroyed by Gilgamesh, who proceeds to power the boat with 120 stakes he has to make to replace the "stone-things". He is banished from Kur by the immortal survivor of the flood Utnapishtim for no discernible reason, possibly for conveying Gilgamesh across the Hubur. They both ferry back to Uruk where they behold its splendour. His later Assyrian incarnation is called Hamar-tabal, who is described as a horrible monster.

See also
 Manunggul Jar - Early depiction similar figure on burial jar from Tabon Caves on Palawan

References

Mesopotamian gods
Epic of Gilgamesh